Mirza Rahimlu (also Romanized as Mīrzā Raḩīmlū) is a village in Vilkij-e Markazi Rural District, Vilkij District, Namin County, Ardabil Province, Iran. At the 2006 census, its population was 51, in 12 families.

References 

Towns and villages in Namin County